Benarkabud-e Seh (also Romanized as Benārkabūd-e Seh, meaning "Benarkabud 3") is a village in Teshkan Rural District, Chegeni District, Dowreh County, Lorestan Province, Iran. At the 2006 census, its population was 165, in 36 families.

References 

Towns and villages in Dowreh County